Aghavnadzor is a village in the Areni Municipality of the Vayots Dzor Province in Armenia.

The 12th-century church of Saint Astvatsatsin is 4 km northeast of Aghavnadzor, with a funerary monument from the year 1009 nearby. The ruins of a caravanserai are located 4 km to the northwest, and 4 km north is the 13th to 14th-century Ul Gyughi church. The 13th-century Aghjkaberd fortress is located 1 km east of the village.

Toponymy 
The village was previously known as Aynadzor and Aynazur.

Gallery

References

External links 

 
 
 

Populated places in Vayots Dzor Province